Aranthangi block is a Revenue block in Pudukkottai district, Tamil Nadu, India. It has a total of 53 panchayat villages.

Villages of Aranthangi block
1.	Alapiranthan
2.	Aliyanilai
3.	Amanji 
4.	Amarasimendrapuram 
5.	Arasarkulam Keelpathi 
6.	Arasarkulam Thenpathi 
7.	Arasarkulam Vadapathy 
8.	Athani, Pudukkottai 
9.	Avanathankottai, Pudukkottai 
10.	Ayinkudi 
11.	Edaiyar
12.	Eganivayal 
13.	Egaperumagalur 
14.	Kammakadu 
15.	Kilakudiammanjakki 
16.	Kodivayal 
17.	Kongudi 
18.	Kulathur, Pudukkottai 
19.	Kurumbur 
20.	Mangalanadu 
21.	Mangudi, Aranthangi, Pudukkottai 
22.	Mannakudi 
23.	Maramadakki 
24.	Melapattu
25.	Melmangalam 
26.	Merpanaikadu 
27.	Mookudi
28. Nayakkarpatti
29.	Nagudi 
30.	Narpavalakudi 
31.	Nattumangalam 
32.	Nevathali 
33.	Oorvani 
34.	Panchathi 
35.	Paravakottai 
36.	Periyaloor 
37.	Perugadu 
38.	Poovathakudi 
39.	Rajendrapuram 
40.	Ramasamypuram 
41.	Rethinakottai 
42.	Silattur 
43.	Sittankadu 
44.	Subramaniyapuram, Pudukkottai 
45.	Sunaiyakadu 
46.	Thanthani 
47.	Thirunallur, Aranthangi, Pudukkottai 
48.	Tholuvankadu
49.	Vallavari 
50.	Vembakudi East 
51.	Vembakudi West 
52.	Vettivayal 
53.	Vijayapuram, Pudukkottai

See also
Vaadikkadu, Pudukkottai

References 

 

Revenue blocks of Pudukkottai district